John A. Davenport (September 11, 1904 – June 8, 1987<ref>John Davenport obituary, in The New York Times, June 12, 1987</ref>) was an American journalist and writer, the editor of Barron's, a longtime editor of Fortune and a career-long exponent of the moral and economic case for free markets.

Davenport was born in Philadelphia, the son of Russell W. Davenport, Sr., a vice president of Bethlehem Steel Corp., and Cornelia Whipple Farnum. He attended the horsey, orange-blossom redolent Thacher School in Ojai, California (a happy cultural shock for a boy from the Philadelphia Mainline), followed by a year at Deep Springs College. He graduated from Yale University in 1926 and joined the staff of the New York World''in 1927, where he remained until 1930.

A bout of tuberculosis interrupted Davenport's journalistic career, but his time at a Saranac Lake, N.Y. sanitorium was not entirely wasted. A favorite Yale philosophy professor, Wilbur Marshall Urban assigned (and subsequently graded) the papers that the recovering patient would write on the works of Hegel, Marx, Kant and others.

Restored to health, Davenport in 1937 followed his older brother Russell Davenport to Fortune (Russell had just become that magazine's managing editor), where, over the course of the next 28 years, Davenport wrote more than 150 pieces and edited at least a hundred more.

Davenport resigned from Fortune in 1949 to take over the editorship of Barron's with the avowed aim of refashioning that weekly financial paper into "an American Economist," but the Dow Jones Co., owner of Barron's, proved less financially committed to that ambitious project than its new editor. "Hell, John, want do they want for a nickel?" sympathetically growled Henry Luce, founder of Time-Life, in welcoming Davenport back to Fortune in 1954. He stayed there until 1969.

In his fifth and final year at Barron's, Davenport attacked Sen. Joseph McCarthy for the reason, as the editor's page-one article put it, "that this little man is becoming a public nuisance." “What the country needs most in meeting the internal Communist threat," said Davenport's editorial, which ran out under the headline, "Little Man, What Now?" “is inquiry that lives up to reasonable standards.

Davenport was the co-author, with Charles J.V. Murphy, of "The Lives of Winston Churchill" [Scribner & Sons, 1945] and "The U.S. Economy," [Regnery,1964].

Davenport served on the Hoover Commission and on the Harriman Committee on Foreign Aid. He attended the 1947 meeting of the newly formed Mont Pelerin Society and was a lifelong member of the organization. He was an early supporter of William F. Buckley's National Review. He espoused, among other causes, the gold standard, a vigorous check on the Soviet Union, the right to work (i.e., to work without compulsory union membership) and the right of the present-day Zimbabwe (then Rhodesia) and of South Africa to reform their respective racist political and social institutions free from American trade and investment sanctions.

“Admittedly," wrote Davenport of the apartheid government of South Africa, "the color bar is an offensive and clumsy way to limit the follies of doctrinaire democracy. Far better to knit minimal educational or property requirements into the franchise as obtained in the infancy of the United States."

In the 1970s, he travelled to Rhodesia and lobbied for the racist regime of Ian Smith in the US, co-chairing the American-Rhodesian Association. He also opposed sanctions against Apartheid South Africa, opining that "the world owes South Africa a debt for refusing to go along with the mania of majority rule and “one man one vote once.""

Davenport and his wife, Marie Hayes Davenport, who were married on October 11, 1941, resided in New York City until 1974 when they moved to Middletown, NJ.  They had seven children, Ann Davenport Dixon, Glorianna Davenport, Susan Brooke, Amy Davenport, John Davenport Jr, Sharon Davenport and Caroline Johnson.

In a Fortune article entitled "Beaches of the Mind," Davenport wrote about mental illness and then-current scientific thinking about treatment. The decision by a major business magazine to publish on this topic broke new ground.

Marie Davenport was a founding member of CCCPA, today known as Triple C Housing, an organization to support transitional programs for the mentally ill.

In recalling Davenport, William F. Buckley Jr. wrote: “He was a graduate of Yale and was always rather distinctively Old Blue, combining random characteristics of that institution: social conventionality, crew cut, bookishness, a quiet self-assurance, a reliable sense of humor. To his friends at National Review he was a reliable professional performer, animated by a total commitment to the value of his thought. And, always, he was comforted by the conviction that his friends here were friends all the way, friends in this world and in this next.” 

Davenport's papers are held by the Hoover Institution Archives.

References

External links 
 Register of the John Davenport Papers, with brief bio, at Online Archive of California

20th-century American journalists
American male journalists
1904 births
1987 deaths
Writers from Philadelphia